is a Japanese Nippon Professional Baseball pitcher for the Chunichi Dragons in Japan's Central League.

He previously played at the Hokkaido Nippon Ham Fighters and was traded to the Dragons on the 31 July 2017 for cash considerations.

External links

References

Living people
1985 births
Baseball people from Mie Prefecture
Japanese baseball players
Nippon Professional Baseball pitchers
Hokkaido Nippon-Ham Fighters players
Chunichi Dragons　players